Paye or PAYE may refer to:

 Paye (surname)
 Pay As You Earn, a US student loan scheme
 Pay-as-you-earn tax, taxes deducted from each paycheck
 Battle of Paye (1899), Philippines

See also
 Pay (disambiguation)
 PAYG (disambiguation)